Shulman is a surname:

Shulman may also refer to:

Shulman (band), an Israeli psybient band
Shulmanu, a Mesopotamian god

See also
 Schulman